Templeogue is a southwestern suburb of Dublin in Ireland. It lies between the River Poddle and River Dodder, and is about halfway from Dublin's centre to the mountains to the south.

Geography

Location 

Suburbs adjacent to Templeogue are Ballyboden, Ballyroan, Firhouse, Greenhills, Kimmage, Knocklyon, Perrystown, Rathfarnham, Tallaght, and Terenure.

Transport 
The three main routes through the suburb are the R112 regional road (Templeville Road), the R137 regional road (Templeogue Road), and the R817 regional road (Cypress Grove Road and Wainsfort Road).

Dublin Bus operates the following bus routes through Templeogue: 15, 15A, 15B, 15D, 49, 54A, 65, 65B and 150.

Natural features
The River Dodder forms the southern border with Rathfarnham while the River Poddle forms the northern border with Greenhills and Kimmage. The historical artificial watercourse from the Dodder at Firhouse to the Poddle passed through Templeogue.

Etymology
The original Irish language name  refers to a chapel named after Saint Mel that was built there in about 1273.

History
Templeogue was originally a small village in the rural, southern part of County Dublin. In Elizabethan times it was owned by the Talbot family, who later became prominent as the owners of Mount Talbot. The Talbot's estate was forfeited to the Crown on the Restoration of Charles II. In the later seventeenth and eighteenth centuries, it was owned by the Domviles. The Dmoviles could claim some control over the canal, which passed through their estates on its way from the Dodder to the Poddle - at that time it provided Dublin's main drinking water supply, as well as critical power for multiple watermills.

In 1801, the Templeogue Road was constructed, originally as a toll road.

Urban expansion of Dublin during the 1950s and '60s absorbed the village.

Amenities

Schools 

The local schools are St. Pius X National School, Our Lady's Secondary School, Templeogue College, St. Mac Dara's Community College, Bishop Galvin National School, and Bishop Shanahan National School.

Sports 

Local sports facilities are Faughs GAA Club, St. Judes GAA Club, St. Mary's College RFC, Templeogue Swimming Club, Templeogue Tennis Club, and Templeogue United Football Club.

Shops and services 

Shops, restaurants, and small business services are located in the village on Templeogue Road, as well as in Fortfield Park, Cypress Park, Wainsfort Drive, and Rathfarnham Shopping Centre.

Although surrounded by pubs in adjacent neighbourhoods, Templeogue has only one pub inside its boundaries, The Templeogue Inn, also known as The Morgue. In the 19th and early 20th centuries, the Dublin and Blessington Steam Tramway passed through Templeogue so close to the pub that pedestrians were sometimes hit. Some corpses were sheltered in the pub until taken away and the pub acquired the permanent, morbid nickname. The Templeogue Inn was, for a while, the most expensive pub in Ireland when it changed hands on 12 October 1983 for IR£660,000, a remarkable sum at the time.

Churches 

The Roman Catholic parish church is St. Pius X which opened on 27 November 1960 on College Drive. A previous church was situated close to the existing graveyard at Wellington Lane, where the original village of Templeogue was located.

St. Jude's church was built at Orwell Park in 1975 to serve the newer housing estates of Orwell, Willington, Rossmore and surrounding areas.

Politics and administration
Templeogue straddles two Dáil constituencies, with five of its electoral divisions (Templeogue-Cypress, Templeogue-Limekiln, Templeogue-Orwell, Templeogue-Osprey, and Templeogue Village) in the Dublin South-West constituency, and one electoral division (Templeogue-Kimmage Manor) is in Dublin South-Central.

It is administered by South Dublin County Council, and its local electoral area for county council elections is Rathfarnham–Templeogue.

Templeogue is part of the Dublin 6W postal district.

Population
Templeogue's population at the 2016 census was 17,395, a rise of 0.1 per cent from the previous 2011 census. In the twenty-five years from 1991 to 2016, the population fell by 304, a decrease of 1.73 per cent.
The population at the 2011 census was 17,378, a fall of 1.8 per cent from the previous 2006 census.

Culture 
James Joyce, who was born 2 km to the northeast in Rathgar, mentions Templeogue in Finnegans Wake, Book III, Episode 3, page 553, line 12.

The poet Austin Clarke lived in Bridge House beside Templeogue Bridge, which spans the River Dodder. After his death, there was a proposal to preserve the house and his library of 6,500 books as a memorial. This was not possible owing to long-term plans to demolish the house and widen the road. The old Templeogue Bridge, built in 1800, and Bridge House were removed and a new bridge was opened by Councillor Mrs. Bernie Malone, Chairman Dublin City Council on 11 December 1984, which was renamed Austin Clarke Bridge in his honour.

Notable residents

 Mary Beckett — Novelist and short story writer.
 Austin Clarke — Poet, novelist, playwright, author, English lecturer.
 Liam Cosgrave — Taoiseach; leader of Fine Gael.
 W. T. Cosgrave — First President of the Executive Council of the Irish Free State.
 Larry Gogan — Disc jockey; radio and television broadcaster.
 Ursula Halligan — Journalist and broadcaster.
 Charles Lever — Doctor and novelist.
 John McCann — Teachta Dála for Dublin South; Alderman on Dublin City Council; Lord Mayor of Dublin; playwright and author; journalist; father of the actor Donal McCann.
 Kevin McManamon - Football player for St Jude's GAA club and formerly for Dublin county football team (2010 to 2021).
 Michael Mills — Political journalist with the Irish Press and Ombudsman of Ireland.
 Flora Shaw — Writer who coined the name "Nigeria" for the African country.
 Sir Frederick Shaw — Recorder of Dublin 1830–76 and Dundalk; built Kimmage Manor.
 Sir Robert Shaw — Tory MP for Dublin City 1830–1831 and 1832; member of the Privy Council of Ireland; owner of Bushy Park estate.
 George Simms — Church of Ireland Archbishop of Dublin; Archbishop of Armagh and Primate of All Ireland.
 Mervyn Taylor — Dublin County Councillor, Teachta Dála, Minister for Labour, and Minister for Equality and Law Reform.

Pictures

References

External links

 Aerial photograph of Templeogue
 The Story of Templeogue, Templeogue Ladies' Club, 1992–05. Text in PDF form at South County Dublin Libraries. Retrieved 2010-12-24.

 
Uppercross